Peter Schacht (1 July 1901 – 25 January 1945) was a German composer.

Life 
Born in Bremen, Schacht came from a wealthy Bremen merchant family. In his hometown he attended the humanistic Gymnasium, being particularly interested in mathematical questions. Early on he also received piano, violin and clarinet lessons. Later (1931) he took a course in Baden-Baden taught by violinist Carl Flesch. In addition, he received composition lessons from the late Romantic Julius Weismann. In Freiburg, he joined the Corps Suevia Freiburg in 1921, which he left again in 1934 in protest against the exclusion of the so-called "Jüdisch versippt".

Afterwards, he wanted to enter the master class by Arnold Schönberg at the Prussian Academy of Arts and applied for it with a neoclassicist String Quintet, which is considered his first surviving composition. After an initial rejection, Schönberg accepted him into his private circle of students. His Variations on a Folk Song for piano (1927) were probably written under Schönberg. In the winter semester of 1927/28 he officially became Schönberg's (longest) master student (until 1932). In 1929 he created his important piano work Variations on a Theme by Bach. In 1932, his II Sonata for Violin and Piano (1932) received distinguished recognition at the Emil Hertzka Prize of Universal Edition in Vienna.

After the Machtergreifung by the Nazis, the Schönberg circle dissolved. In 1933, his String Quartet (1932) was given a scandalous premiere at the Dortmund Tonkünstlerfest. Schacht was not prepared to withdraw the work as demanded. He described it as a "farewell performance in Germany". Until 1936 he lived in seclusion in the inner emigration in Berlin.

After 1936, also for financial reasons, he tried to re-establish himself with tonality music to regain a foothold. He withdrew the performance of his Two Pieces for Clarinet and Piano (1931) in 1937 at the World Music Days of the International Society for New Music (IGNM). However, he had his Three Pieces for String Orchestra (c. 1936/37) played at an event of the Permanent Council for the International Cooperation of Composers, a National Socialist-dominated counter-organisation to the IGNM, in Winterthur. In 1940, his plot ballet Andreasnacht was premiered in Essen under Winfried Zillig - although the music, according to Zillig, looked very blatantly like jazz, the performance was a success. In 1941, he was drafted into the Wehrmacht to guard British prisoner of wars and transferred to Poznań. There, he composed the Kinderstücke for piano and a serenade (lost). Shortly before the end of the war in 1945, he was killed by a Soviet shell during the Battle of Poznań. He was aged 43.

Most of his works are documented in the Archiv Deutsche Musikpflege Bremen. Influenced by Schoenberg, he "composed intelligent, technically skilful, if not very original music of a lyrical basic attitude". In the early 1930s, he created atonal and series-organised music, which, however, is by no means twelve-tone technique" (Ludwig Holtmeier).

Further reading 
 
 Ludwig Holtmeier: Schacht, Peter. In Ludwig Finscher (ed.): Die Musik in Geschichte und Gegenwart. Second edition, personal part, volume 14 (Riccati – Schönstein). Bärenreiter/Metzler, Kassel among others 2005,  (Subscription required for full access)
 Peter Schacht, in KDG – Komponisten der Gegenwart, im Munzinger-Archiv (start of article freely retrievable) in KDG – Komponisten der Gegenwart
 Rudolf Vierhaus (ed.): Deutsche Biographische Enzyklopädie. Volume 8: Poethen–Schlüter. 2nd, revised and expanded edition, K. G. Saur Verlag, Munich 2007, .

References

External links 
 
 

20th-century German composers
20th-century classical composers
Ballet composers
1901 births
1945 deaths
Musicians from Bremen
German military personnel killed in World War II
German Army personnel of World War II
Deaths by firearm in Poland
Deaths by explosive device